Cosmic energy is a form of energy in spirituality and alternative medicine.

Cosmic energy may also refer to:

Religion and science
Orgone, a pseudoscientific concept
Shakti, the cosmic energy in Hinduism
Cosmic background (disambiguation)
Cosmic ray, a form of ionizing radiation from outer space

Arts and entertainment
 Power Cosmic, the source of the superpowers of the Silver Surfer and Galactus
 "Cosmic Energy", a song by Kool and the Gang from the album Love & Understanding
 Cosmic Energy, an extended play on the Katy Perry discography